This is a list of films which placed number one at the weekend box office for the year 2013.

Highest-grossing films

References

See also
 List of American films — American films by year

2013
2013 in Venezuela
Venezuela